Dentaliida is one of the two orders of scaphopod mollusks, commonly known as elephant's tusk shells. The order Dentaliida contains most of the larger scaphopods, and is distinguished from the other order (the Gadilidae) by the shape of its shell (the Dentaliid shell tapers uniformly from anterior to posterior; the Gadilid one has an anterior shell opening slightly smaller than the shell's widest point), the shape of the foot (the Dentaliid foot is boat-shaped with a central trough; the Gadilid foot is star-shaped), and the arrangement of some of their internal organs.

Families
 Anulidentaliidae
 Calliodentaliidae
 Dentaliidae
 Fustiariidae
 Gadilinidae
 Laevidentaliidae
 Omniglyptidae
 Rhabdidae

References

Scaphopods
Mississippian first appearances
Extant Carboniferous first appearances